The Baracoa Regional Airport  is an airport serving the city of Magangué in the Bolívar Department of Colombia.

The Baracoa Regional Airport used to be a hub for airline operations such as Avianca, LANZA and Satena. However, on January 4, 1969, the airport ceased its commercial passenger flight operations and closed its flight schools, following a decision to focus on traffic from smaller aircraft.

The Magangue VOR-DME (Ident: MGN) is located on the field.

See also

Transport in Colombia
List of airports in Colombia

References

External links
OpenStreetMap - Baracoa
OurAirports - Baracoa
SkyVector - Baracoa
FallingRain - Baracoa Airport

Airports in Colombia
Buildings and structures in Bolívar Department